The Million Tree Initiative refers to the ongoing environmental projects that multiple cities have individually committed to, aimed at increasing the urban forest through the planting of one million trees. Cities that are known to be currently involved in this initiative are: Los Angeles, Denver, New York City, Shanghai, London, Ontario, and Amherst, New York.  A common motive shared between these participating cities is, according to their mission statements, the reduction of carbon dioxide in the air to reduce the effects of global warming.

History
In May 2006, Mayor Antonio Villaraigosa made Million Trees LA one of his campaign promises.  The Los Angeles project is funded by a mix of federal money and municipal funding, charities, and corporate donations. It was one of among forty winners from 200 nominees to obtain a United States Environmental Protection Agency (EPA) Environmental Award in 2009.

The Mile High Million, an initiative started by then Mayor John Hickenlooper, is a similar program in Denver, Colorado. This was announced by Hickenlooper in his 2006 State of the City Address. 

On April 22, 2007, Mayor Michael Bloomberg revealed goals of planting one million trees by 2017 as part of PlaNYC, a plan designed for the sustainability of New York City. In the same year, China began its own tree planting program for Shanghai, with the same goal for one million trees.

The million trees program began in London in 2011.

Benefits

References

External links
Whatcom Million Trees Project - Bellingham, Washington, USA
Million Trees LA
Million Trees Denver
Million Trees NYC
Million Trees Shanghai
Million Trees - London, Ontario
Plant A Million Tree - Pune, India

Environmental policy in the United States
Environment of Greater Los Angeles
Trees of New York City
Environment of Canada
Urban forestry
Reforestation
Forestry initiatives